Arkhangelskoye is a rural locality (a selo) and the administrative center of Arkhangelskoye Rural Settlement, Yusvinsky District, Perm Krai, Russia. The population was 508 as of 2010. There are 24 streets.

Geography 
Arkhangelskoye is located 10 km north of Yusva (the district's administrative centre) by road. Sekovo is the nearest rural locality.

References 

Rural localities in Yusvinsky District